The Ranger 16 is an American sailboat, that was designed by Gary Mull and first built in 1987.

Production
The boat was built by Ranger Yachts in the United States, starting in 1987, but  is now out of production.

Design
The Ranger 16 is a small recreational dinghy, built predominantly of fiberglass. It has a fractional sloop rig, a transom-hung rudder and a retractable centerboard keel. It displaces .

See also
List of sailing boat types

References

Dinghies
1980s sailboat type designs
Sailing yachts
Sailboat types built in the United States
Sailboat type designs by Gary Mull
Sailboat types built by Ranger Yachts